Ulvaria  may refer to:
 Ulvaria (fish), an animal genus in the family Stichaeidae
 Ulvaria (alga), a plant genus in the family Ulvaceae